Gulella salpinx, common name Trumpet-mouthed hunter snail,  is a species of very small air-breathing land snail, a terrestrial pulmonate gastropod mollusk in the family Streptaxidae.

This species is endemic to Marble Delta, South Africa. Its natural habitat is subtropical or tropical dry forests. It is threatened by habitat loss.

Ecology 
Gulella salpinx is ovoviviparous.

References

Endemic fauna of South Africa
Gulella
Gastropods described in 2002
Taxonomy articles created by Polbot